Shaochilong (meaning "shark toothed dragon") is an extinct genus of carcharodontosaurid dinosaur from the mid-Cretaceous (Late Cenomanian to the end of the Turonian stage) Ulansuhai Formation of China (about 92 million years ago). The type species, S. maortuensis, was originally named Chilantaisaurus maortuensis, but was re-described and reclassified in 2009. It was one of the last known carcharodontosaurids to walk the earth. Alongside Mapusaurus from Argentina, they were the only members of the family to live until the end of the Turonian epoch.

History
The material referred to Shaochilong, IVPP V.2885.1-7, consisted of skull fragments (a braincase, partial skull roof, quadrates, and a right maxilla), axis and six caudal vertebrae. A fragmentary left maxilla was also referred to the species, although it has apparently gone missing as of 2009. Although these are believed to belong to a single individual, a lectotype was established in 2010 to accommodate for the possibility that the specimens came from multiple individuals. The lectotype consists of the braincase (IVPP V.2885.1) and partial skull roof (IVPP V.2885.2). All of these specimens were discovered in Inner Mongolia and described by Hu in 1964 as a species of Chilantaisaurus. The genus was informally named "Alashansaurus" by Chure in 2000.

Chure (2002) and Rauhut (2001) suggested that it did not belong to that genus, and was probably a primitive coelurosaur. However, a re-description by Brusatte and colleagues in 2009 found that it was a carcharodontosaurid, the first recognized from Asia. This re-description also provided a new genus name. A more comprehensive description and discussion was published the following year.

Description 

The individual which IVPP V2885.1 belonged to was probably adult or nearly adult individual, due to the fusion of many elements of the braincase. This made Shaochilong an uncharacteristically small carcharodontosaurid, in contrast with other members of the family, which were among the largest carnivorous animals on earth. Nevertheless, as an unambiguous example of a fairly large carnosaur in middle Cretaceous Asia, it provides information on the ecosystem of this setting and is evidence that carcharodontosaurids persisted through the middle cretaceous and that large tyrannosaurids (such as Tyrannosaurus) did not dominate Laurasia until the very end of the Cretaceous.

According to the proportions of its maxilla, Shaochilong was a relatively short-faced carcharodontosaur. In combination with its comparatively small size, it could have had a unique ecological role in comparison to other members of the family.

Shaochilong can be distinguished from other carcharodontosaurids due to having the following autapomorphies:
 A reduced and nearly absent maxillary antorbital fossa.
 No paradental groove on the medial surface of the maxilla.
 Deep vertical grooves located dorsally on the maxillary interdental plates.
 A pneumatic recess which penetrates to the posterior end of the nasal.
 A deep sagittal crest on the frontal.
 A large pneumatic foramen in the anterodorsal corner of the prootic's dorsal tympanic recess.

Classification

Phylogenetic analysis performed by Brusatte and coworkers indicate that Shaochilong is deeply nested within the carchorodontosaurids, the most derived group among the allosauroids. Shaochilong appears to be more closely related to the Gondwanan carcharodontosaurids (Tyrannotitan, Carcharodontosaurus, Mapusaurus, Giganotosaurus) than the Laurasian ones (such as Neovenator and Acrocanthosaurus). Shaochilong is the youngest known Laurasian allosauroid suggesting that basal tetanurans not tyrannosaurids, were still the dominant group of large-bodied theropods in Laurasian during the Mid-Cretaceous and that the rise of tyrannosaurids as the dominant group of large terrestrial predators was sudden and confined to the very end of the Cretaceous.

The following cladogram after Novas et al., 2013, shows the position of Shaochilong within Carcharodontosauridae.

References

External links

 Shark toothed theropods in Asia – introducing Shaochilong Discoverers' blog

Carcharodontosaurids
Late Cretaceous dinosaurs of Asia
Cretaceous animals of Asia
Fossils of China
Fossil taxa described in 2009
Taxa named by Stephen L. Brusatte
Taxa named by Xu Xing
Turonian life